The 1986 BCE Canadian Masters was a professional non-ranking snooker tournament that took place between 28 October–1 November 1986 at the CBC Television Studios in Toronto, Canada.

Steve Davis won the tournament by defeating Willie Thorne 9–3 in the final.

Main draw

References

Canadian Masters (snooker)
Canadian Masters
Canadian Masters
Canadian Masters
Canadian Masters